363 Copa De Oro Road, often referred to as The Pink Palace, is a luxurious red-brick mock 18th-century French mansion on Copa De Oro Road in the affluent East Gate Bel Air neighborhood in the hills of Los Angeles, California. It lies in very close proximity to Château des Fleurs and Bel-Air Country Club and is noted for being the home of numerous celebrities including Dean Martin,  Tom Jones and Nicolas Cage.

Location
The house is situated in East Gate Bel Air on Copa De Oro Road ('cup of gold' in Spanish), which was "coined to reflect the millionaire status of its inhabitants". Copa De Oro Road was named in 2015 as one of the "15 Priciest Streets in America",  with a median home value estimated at US$10.264 million.

History
The house was the home of Dean Martin in the 1960s and early 1970s. In 1966, during a concert at the Sands Hotel and Casino in Las Vegas, Sinatra mentioned the house and the "evenings of fun" that he, Martin, and others would have. Sinatra joked that they would drink until 3:30 am and then eat dinner and be dragged into the dining room lying on their backs by Martin's mother-in-law Peggy and a "big dog".

Martin sold the house to Sir Tom Jones for $500,000 in June 1976. Jones resold it to Nicolas Cage in 1998 for a reported $6.469 million. It has since been valued as high as $35 million since going on the market in 2007, but as of 2015 it is worth $10.4 million.

Architecture
The red-brick property,  in size, was built in 1940 by Gerard Colcord. It has six bedrooms and nine bathrooms. 
The house was built in the 18th century country house style, and is noted for its polished wooden paneling in the interior. When Tom Jones purchased the property in 1976 he had all of his furniture from Weybridge shipped over and stepped up security by installing electronic gates, "adorned with Welsh dragons".

References

Sources

External links
"Christmas Comes Early: Inside Nicolas Cage's Copa De Oro Mansion" Curbed Los Angeles, September 10, 2009

Houses in Los Angeles
Bel Air, Los Angeles
Houses completed in 1940
1940 establishments in California